Go West is a 1940 American Western comedy film from Metro-Goldwyn-Mayer starring the Marx Bros. In their tenth film, (Groucho Marx, Harpo Marx, and Chico Marx) head to the American West and attempt to unite a couple by ensuring that a stolen property deed is retrieved. The film  was directed by Edward Buzzell and written by Irving Brecher.

The film also features actors John Carroll and Diana Lewis as the love interests and actress and singer June MacCloy.

Plot
Confidence man S. Quentin Quale is heading west to seek his fortune, but is short ten dollars for a train ticket. In the railroad station, he encounters brothers Joseph and Rusty Panello and attempts to swindle their money, but the two are also con men and manage to swindle Quale's money, instead. The Panellos are friends with an old prospector named Dan Wilson whose near worthless property, Dead Man's Gulch, has no gold. The Panello's loan Wilson their last ten dollars for a grubstake and he insists on giving them the deed to the Gulch as collateral. Unbeknownst to Wilson, Terry Turner, the son of his longtime rival and beau to his granddaughter Eve, has travelled to New York in order to persuade the Railroad to purchase Dead Man's Gulch from Dan Wilson. Terry convinces the railway officials that the gulch is the only practical route through the mountains to the west. The railroad agrees to buy the property thus making the deed holder rich. After Quale attempts to swindle the Panellos out of the deed, crooked railroad executive John Beecher and
shady saloon owner "Red" Baxter manage to steal the deed from Quale; Quale and the Panello brothers help Terry and Eve retrieve the deed and deliver it to the railroad officials in New York.

Cast

Uncredited Cast

Production

Like all other Marx Brothers MGM films, Go West has several musical numbers, including "You Can't Argue with Love" by Bronislau Kaper and Gus Kahn, "Ridin' the Range" by Roger Edens and Gus Kahn, "From the Land of the Sky-Blue Water" by Charles Wakefield Cadman and "The Woodpecker Song" by Harold Adamson and Eldo di Lazzaro. (In this song, Chico, playing the piano, rolls an orange on the keys in sync with the melody.)

As with A Night at the Opera and A Day at the Races, the Marxes played key comedy scenes from Go West live onstage on a pre-filming tour; this tour was much shorter than that for the first two films, lasting three weeks.

Groucho was aged 49 during the filming of Go West, and his hairline had begun receding. As such, he took to wearing a toupee again throughout the film, as he did in the previous film, At the Circus.

The railroad scenes were filmed on the Sierra Railroad in Tuolumne County, California.

Musical numbers
"You Can't Argue With Love"
"From the Land of the Sky-Blue Water"
"Ridin' The Range"

Reception
Thomas M. Pryor of The New York Times called the film "an unevenly paced show" with "only one really funny sequence," referring to the climax. Variety wrote, "The three Marx Bros. ride a merry trail of laughs and broad burlesque in a speedy adventure through the sagebrush country," adding that the film had "many fresh situations for the Marxian antics." Harrison's Reports wrote that it was "much better than their last two pictures" and that the final twenty minutes "should thrill as well as amuse spectators." Film Daily called it "wildly funny in places, amusing for the most part and dead in one or two spots that a little editing could improve." John Mosher of The New Yorker wrote, "Possibly not the most strenuous Marxian product that we have seen, the picture nevertheless is very satisfactory and quite lunatic enough."

References

External links

 
 
 

1940 films
1940s Western (genre) comedy films
American black-and-white films
1940s English-language films
Marx Brothers (film series)
American Western (genre) comedy films
Films about mining
Rail transport films
Metro-Goldwyn-Mayer films
Films directed by Edward Buzzell
Films with screenplays by Buster Keaton
Films with screenplays by Irving Brecher
1940 comedy films
1940s American films